Nancy Drew: The Deadly Device is the 27th installment in the Nancy Drew point-and-click adventure game series by Her Interactive. The game is available for play on Microsoft Windows and Mac OS X platforms. It has an ESRB rating of E10+ for moments of mild violence. Players take on the first-person view of fictional amateur sleuth Nancy Drew and must solve the mystery through interrogation of suspects, solving puzzles and discovering clues. There are two levels of gameplay, Amateur and Master sleuth modes, each offering a different difficulty level of puzzles and hints, however neither of these changes affect the actual plot of the game. The game is loosely based on two books, The Crime Lab Case (2000) and In and Out of Love (1997).

Plot 
Theoretical physicist Niko Jovic is found fatally electrocuted in a remote Colorado laboratory, Technology of Tomorrow Today, under suspicious circumstances. Relating to wireless transmission of electricity, Niko Jovic's work could sell for millions on the market. With the case stuck at a dead end, the lab owner has asked Nancy Drew to go undercover to investigate this murder. Tensions rise as attempts on Nancy's life start, Nancy must get to the bottom of this case before the murderer catches up with her.

Development

Characters 
 Nancy Drew (Lani Minella) - Nancy is an 18-year-old amateur detective from the fictional town of River Heights in the United States. She is the only playable character in the game, which means the player must solve the mystery from her perspective.
 Niko Jovic (Josh Crandall) - Rumors in the scientific community said that he had discovered the secret to wireless energy transfer. But before he could release his findings to the world, he was found murdered. Like Tesla, Niko was clever yet secretive. Could someone be looking for what he left behind? 
 Ryan Kilpatrick (Katherine Grant-Suttie) - Ryan is a technical engineer that has built and modified several parts of the lab. Her knowledge of the Tesla coil makes her a prime suspect. Is her nice girl impression genuine or an act? 
 Mason Quinto (Marc Biagi) - Mason is the smart, driven, and arrogant senior lab assistant. He likes structure and perfection, and values his work. Unlike Niko, Mason believes in proprietary rights. How far will he go to get the credit for his work that he thinks he deserves? 
 Ellie York (Sara Mountjoy-Pepka) - Ellie works the night shift in the research department. She is a little evasive and does not get along well with Mason, which drove her to work opposite shifts. While appearing genuinely shaken, her actions after Niko's death seem to indicate that she could be hiding something. 
 Gray Cortright (Mark Dodson) - Gray is the head of security. Not the friendly type, he comes across as a little intimidating and is not forthcoming while being questioned. His knowledge and unrestricted access to all areas provide plenty of opportunity for sneaking around unnoticed. 
 Victor Lossett (David Cravens-O'Farrell) - Victor is the co-owner of the lab. He has hired you to solve the cold case murder. Eager for the case to be solved, he pushes Nancy to find the culprit. Niko's work and name appear to be very important to him, but there could be more to this mystery than meets the eye.

Additional voice work was performed by Jayme Crandall.

Reception 

Jinny Gudmundsen of USA Today rated it 3.5/4 stars and wrote, "While this mystery is exciting, what makes it even better is that it is filled with intellectually challenging puzzles — most of which are baked into the story...The developer does a great job of combining real science with a compelling mystery."  Brandy Shaul of Gamezebo rated it 3.5/5 stars and wrote, "The storyline is easily the best thing Nancy Drew: Deadly Device has going for it. With so many installments under its proverbial belt, Her Interactive clearly knows how to develop an intriguing tale, and that’s no exception here."  Merlina McGovern of Adventure Gamers rated it 3.5/5 stars and wrote, "Despite its slow start and limited exploration, The Deadly Device provides a good jolt to the franchise with its compelling story and fun puzzles."

References 

2012 video games
Detective video games
Video games based on Nancy Drew
Video games developed in the United States
Video games set in Colorado
Point-and-click adventure games
Windows games
MacOS games
Her Interactive games
Single-player video games
North America-exclusive video games